David James Hodgson (born 6 August 1960) is an English former footballer who played for Middlesbrough, Liverpool, Norwich City, Sunderland and Sheffield Wednesday, as well as top division clubs FC Metz in France, Mazda in Japan, and Jerez Club Deportivo in Spain. During his two-year spell at Liverpool he helped them win the First Division twice. He made 49 appearances in total between 1982 and 1984 .

He was director of sport at bhpsport, a division of Blackett Hart & Pratt LLP. He left his post as Darlington manager in October 2006, where he was in his third spell in charge of the team, managing over 400 games.  In 2004, he wrote a book titled Three Times A Quaker: My World of Football and Passion for Darlington F.C. published by Speakeasy Publishing.
Voted in top 25 North East Managers of all time .

Honours

As a player
Liverpool
FA Charity Shield winner: [[1982/83FA Charity Shield|1983/1984oref></ref>
First Division Title winner: 1982–83, 1983–84
European Cup winner: 1983–84
Sunderland
Milk Cup runner-up: 1984–85
England U-21s
UEFA Under-21 Football Championship Title winner: 1982

As a manager
Darlington
Division Three Play-Off Final runner-up: 1999–00

Managerial statistics

References

External links
 
 
 Career information at ex-canaries.co.uk
 Profile at LFCHistory.net
 Liverpool FC profile
 

1960 births
Living people
English footballers
English expatriate footballers
England under-21 international footballers
English football managers
Middlesbrough F.C. players
Liverpool F.C. players
Sunderland A.F.C. players
Norwich City F.C. players
Sheffield Wednesday F.C. players
Swansea City A.F.C. players
Darlington F.C. managers
Xerez CD footballers
Expatriate footballers in Spain
Segunda División players
FC Metz players
Expatriate footballers in France
Sanfrecce Hiroshima players
Japan Soccer League players
Expatriate footballers in Japan
Association football forwards
English expatriate sportspeople in Japan
English expatriate sportspeople in Spain
English expatriate sportspeople in France